Sydney Binks (25 July 1899 – 4 February 1978) was a professional footballer who played for Bishop Auckland, Spennymoor United, Sheffield Wednesday, Huddersfield Town, Blackpool, Portsmouth, Southend United, Fulham, Chesterfield before returning to Sheffield Wednesday.

References

External links
Sheffield Wednesday profile

1899 births
1978 deaths
English footballers
Association football forwards
Sportspeople from Bishop Auckland
Footballers from County Durham
English Football League players
Spennymoor United F.C. players
Bishop Auckland F.C. players
Sheffield Wednesday F.C. players
Huddersfield Town A.F.C. players
Blackpool F.C. players
Portsmouth F.C. players
Southend United F.C. players
Fulham F.C. players
Chesterfield F.C. players
Ashington A.F.C. players